Sueliton Pereira de Aguiar  or simply  Sueliton  (born 19 August 1986), is a Brazilian footballer who currently plays for Paraná Clube as a right back.

Career

Early career
Born in Vitória de Santo Antão, Pernambuco, Sueliton began his career with Vitória das Tabocas. He then joined Pernambuco state club Porto-PE, remaining at the club for four years. The following seasons he played for 7 de Setembro, and Sergipe CS before returning to Porto during the 2009 season. The following season he re-joined Vitória das Tabocas before moving to Serie C club ABC Futebol Clube.

São José
For the 2011 season Sueliton moved to Campeonato Gaúcho side São José EC and quickly established himself as one of the top right backs in the league. In his one season with the club, he appeared in 13 matches and scored 2 goals, being selected as the best right back of the competition.

Rayo Vallecano
On 2 June 2011 it was announced that Sueliton was joining newly promoted La Liga side Rayo Vallecano as the club's first signing for the upcoming First Division season. However, he failed to appear in any league matches for the Madrid outfit, and rescinded his link on 20 December 2012.

Criciúma
On 17 January 2013 Sueliton joined Criciúma EC. After appearing regularly during the Campeonato Catarinense (with his side finishing first), he made his Série A debut on 7 July, starting in a 2–3 away loss against Atlético Mineiro.

Sueliton scored his first goal in the main category of Brazilian football on 18 August, but in a 1–2 loss at Atlético Paranaense. He finished the campaign with 27 appearances and two goals, as his side narrowly avoided relegation.

Atlético Paranaense
On 20 January 2014 Sueliton signed for Atlético Paranaense. He easily beat competition of fellow newcomer Lucas Olaza, and appeared in 30 matches during the season.

Honours
ABC
Campeonato Brasileiro Série C: 2010
Criciúma
Campeonato Catarinense: 2013
Goiás
 Campeonato Goiano: 2016

References

External links
Atlético Paranaense profile 

Sueliton at playmakerstats.com (English version of ogol.com.br)

1986 births
Living people
Sportspeople from Pernambuco
Brazilian footballers
Association football defenders
Campeonato Brasileiro Série A players
Campeonato Brasileiro Série B players
Clube Atlético do Porto players
ABC Futebol Clube players
São José Esporte Clube players
Criciúma Esporte Clube players
Club Athletico Paranaense players
Clube Náutico Capibaribe players
Rayo Vallecano players
Brazilian expatriate footballers
Brazilian expatriate sportspeople in Spain
Expatriate footballers in Spain